Efe-Kaan Sihlaroglu (born 8 July 2005) is a professional footballer who plays as a midfielder for 2. Bundesliga club Karlsruher SC. Born in Germany, he represents Turkey at international level.

Club career
Sihlaroglu is a youth academy graduate of Karlsruher SC. He signed his first professional contract with the club on 28 October 2021. He made his professional debut for the club on 27 November 2021 in a 4–0 league win against Hannover 96. His debut at the age of 16 years and 142 days made him the youngest player ever to appear in a 2. Bundesliga match, a record which was previously held by Philipp Sonn.

International career
Born in Germany, Sihlaroglu is of Turkish descent. He was called to a training camp for the  Turkey U17s in December 2021. In May 2022, he was named in the squad for the 2022 UEFA European Under-17 Championship.

Career statistics

Club

References

External links
 

2005 births
Living people
German people of Turkish descent
Turkish footballers
German footballers
Footballers from Mannheim
Association football midfielders
Turkey youth international footballers
2. Bundesliga players
Karlsruher SC players